The Benjamin Franklin Holland House (also known as The Gables or Roy Trent Gallemore House) is a historic home in Bartow, Florida. It is located at 590 East Stanford Street. Benjamin Franklin Holland was the father of Spessard Holland, one of Florida's governors as well as a United States senator representing the state. On April 3, 1975, the house was added to the U.S. National Register of Historic Places.

References

External links
 Polk County listings at National Register of Historic Places
 Polk County listings at Florida's Office of Cultural and Historical Programs

Houses on the National Register of Historic Places in Florida
National Register of Historic Places in Polk County, Florida
Buildings and structures in Bartow, Florida
Houses in Polk County, Florida
Shingle Style houses
Vernacular architecture in Florida
Houses completed in 1895
1895 establishments in Florida
Shingle Style architecture in Florida